Ghosts is a fictional graphic novel written by Raina Telgemeier which tells the story of Catrina and her family, who have recently moved to Bahía de la Luna (a fictional town incorporating aspects of Half Moon Bay, Pacifica, and Santa Cruz) in northern California. The move was intended to help the health of Catrina's younger sister, Maya, who has cystic fibrosis.

Plot
The novel opens as the family is ordering at the drive-through of a fictional Double-Back Burger (the colors and logos of which are based on In-N-Out Burger) before leaving southern California for Bahía de la Luna.

As the sisters are exploring Bahía de la Luna, they are surprised by a boy named Carlos Calaveras, who turns out to be one of their new neighbors. Catrina and Maya explore their Mexican heritage with the help of Carlos, culminating in a Dia de los Muertos celebration in November.

Development
The magical realism of Ghosts marks a sharp change from Telgemeier's earlier works, which have been autobiographical (Smile [2010]; Sisters [2014]) or realistic fiction (Drama [2012]). Instead, Telgemeier depicts the titular ghosts as real but benevolent presences to help Catrina understand death and deal with Maya's terminal illness.

Telgemeier stated she was inspired to write Ghosts in part by the death of her young cousin Sabina, who died from cancer at the age of 13. The scenes from the Day of the Dead celebration were left blank in the initial manuscript submitted to Scholastic. Telgemeier waited until she had attended a Day of the Dead celebration in San Francisco to accurately express her experience in the story, which she later called "one of the most moving nights of my life."

Aspects of the town of Bahía de la Luna are inspired by Half Moon Bay, Moss Beach, Monterey, Morro Bay, and Santa Cruz.

The panels were colored by Braden Lamb.

Reception, awards, and recognition
The book received positive reviews. Dan Kois, reviewing for The New York Times called it "a typically empathetic and complex work from a gifted comics creator". Kirkus Reviews said Telgemeier showed "superior visual storytelling" in keeping readers "emotinally [sic] engaged and unable to put down this compelling tale". According to School Library Journal, it is a "can't miss-addition to middle grade graphic novel shelves".

In 2017, Ghosts won an Eisner Award for Best Publication for Kids (ages 9–12) and the Dwayne McDuffie Award for Kids' Comics.

 the paperback version had spent several weeks on The New York Times Best Sellers list under the category "Paperback Graphic Books."

Appropriation charges
After the novel was published, several readers pointed out the cultural appropriation of Dia de los Muertos as well as the problematic sanitized portrayal of the history of Spanish missions in California. Telgemeier responded by posting a short essay acknowledging the critical viewpoints on her website.

References

External links
 
 
 
 

American graphic novels
Eisner Award winners